The Hessen-Pokal (Hesse Cup) is a Group 3 flat horse race in Germany open to thoroughbreds aged three years or older. It is run at Frankfurt over a distance of 2,000 metres (about 1¼ miles), and it is scheduled to take place each year in November.

The race was moved to Krefeld and renamed Niederrhein-Pokal (Lower Rhine Cup) in 2014.

History
The event was established in 1967, and it was originally called the Concentra-Pokal. It used to be held in July, and was initially contested over 2,550 metres. It was cut to 2,500 metres in 1971.

The race was given Group 3 status in 1973. It was shortened to 2,000 metres in 1974. It was renamed after Hesse, the German state where Frankfurt is located, in 1979.

The Hessen-Pokal was promoted to Group 2 level in 1987. It was relegated back to Group 3 in 1989. For a period it was known as the Frankfurt-Pokal.

The race was extended to 2,050 metres in 1999, and restored to 2,000 metres in 2001. It was switched to November in 2006.

Records
Most successful horse (2 wins):
 Harris – 1977, 1979
 Twist King – 1989, 1990

Leading jockey (3 wins):
 Bruce Raymond – Harris (1977, 1979), Ti Amo (1982)
 Terence Hellier – Latmos (1994), Imperioso (2000), Tarlac (2005)

Leading trainer (5 wins):
 Peter Schiergen – Catella (1999), Imperioso (2000), Zöllner (2001), Soldier Hollow (2004), Elle Shadow (2010)

Winners

 The 2008 running took place at Hanover.

 The 2010 edition was held at Dortmund.

See also
 List of German flat horse races
 Recurring sporting events established in 1967 – this race is included under its original title, Concentra-Pokal.

References
 Racing Post / siegerlisten.com:
 1983, 1984, 1985, 1986, 1987, 
 galopp-sieger.de – Frankfurt Cup.
 galopp-sieger.de – Hessen-Pokal.
 horseracingintfed.com – International Federation of Horseracing Authorities – Hessen-Pokal (2012).
 pedigreequery.com – Hessen-Pokal – Frankfurt.

Open middle distance horse races
Horse races in Germany
Sport in Frankfurt